Macrometrula is a fungal genus in the family Psathyrellaceae. The genus is monotypic, containing the single species Macrometrula rubriceps, found growing in a greenhouse in the Kew Gardens, England. This species was originally named Agaricus rubriceps in 1887.

References

Psathyrellaceae
Taxa described in 1887
Fungi of Europe
Monotypic Agaricales genera
Taxa named by Rolf Singer